Kristian Prestgard (29 April 1866 – 25 January 1946) was a Norwegian-born, American journalist and author. He served as the editor of the Norwegian language newspaper Decorah-Posten in Iowa from 1923 until 1946.

Background
Kristian Prestgard was born on the Harelstad farm in the parish of Heidal in Oppland, Norway. His parents were Gudbrand Kristensen Harelstad (1829–69) and Marit Prestgard (1841–97). When his father died early, Kristian moved with his mother back to Prestgard, her family neighboring farm.

Career
Prestgard started folk high school in Gudbrandsdal.  After two years at the Askov Højskole in Jutland, Denmark (1886–88), he started teaching at the folk high school operated by Johan Christian Viggo Ullmann in Seljord. His first year as a teacher at Ullmann's school in Seljord was interrupted by a severe illness followed by two years of recuperation. His second teaching position at the folk high school of Olaus Arvesen at Hamar, was canceled before it had begun because of Arvesen's election to the Parliament of Norway. As consequence, Prestgard was offered a job in Arvesen's newspaper, Oplandenes Avis, which began his career as a journalist.

He attended the 1893 World's Columbian Exposition in Chicago as a correspondent for Norwegian newspapers. Instead of returning home to Norway, he started working in the Norwegian-American press. In 1897, he married Oline Musum (1873–1919) and took a position with a Norwegian language newspaper company in La Crosse, Wisconsin.

In 1898, he joined the editorial staff of Decorah-Posten. Together with Johannes B. Wist,   he also edited the Norwegian-language periodical Symra from 1905 to 1914. He became editor-in-chief of Decorah-Posten in 1923 following the death of Johannes Wist.  Prestgard was also one of the founders of the Norwegian-American Historical Association in 1925. He was appointed a Knight of the Order of St. Olav by the King of Norway during 1926.

Prestgard was also an author, principally of Norwegian-language books. Probably the most widely known of these work was En Sommer i Norge, his account of a journey to Norway with a group of American journalists during 1927. Shortly prior to his death in 1946, he was able to complete his memoirs, From My Life as a Newspaperman in America. The Memoirs of Kristian Prestgard.

Selected works
Nansenfærden  (1896)
Norske Kvad, 1814–1905 (1906)
En Sommer I Norge: I; Fra Den Gamle Heimbygd  (1928)
Fjords and Faces (1937)
Streiftog: Stemninger og Skildringer (1937)

References

Other sources
 Øverland, Orm (1999)   The Western Home: A Literary History of Norwegian America (Oxford University Press)

1866 births
1946 deaths
People from Gudbrandsdal
Norwegian emigrants to the United States
19th-century American writers
20th-century American non-fiction writers
American male journalists
American magazine editors
Women magazine editors
American newspaper editors
People from Decorah, Iowa
Writers from Iowa
19th-century American male writers
Recipients of the St. Olav's Medal
20th-century American male writers